Boxley Abbey Barn is a large medieval barn in Boxley, Kent. It is a remnant of the buildings of the mostly demolished Boxley Abbey.

It is constructed of local ragstone with two storeys and a plan tiled gable roof. Irregularly sized and placed windows and doors punctuate each of its façades. The building was used by the Abbey as its Hospitium and later as a tithe barn.

Boxley Abbey Barn is a Grade I listed building and is on the Historic England Heritage at Risk Register. The barn is included as part of the Scheduled monument which covers the site of Boxley Abbey.

See also
Grade I listed buildings in Maidstone
List of scheduled monuments in Maidstone

References

External links

Buildings and structures completed in the 13th century
Borough of Maidstone
Grade I listed buildings in Kent
Grade I listed agricultural buildings
Barns in England